Strategy X may refer to:
Strategy X (video game), a 1981 video game for the arcades and Atari 2600.
Strategy X (X-Men: Evolution episode), the first episode of X-Men: Evolution